Paris 13 Atletico is a French football club based in the 13th arrondissement of Paris. It competes in the Championnat National, the third tier of French football. 

The club was founded in 1968 as Football Club Gobelins. It was renamed Football Club des Gobelins Paris 13 after a merger in 2012 with Stade Olympique de Paris. In June 2020 the club announced it would rebrand to the current name to assert its Parisian identity. In 2022 the club was promoted to Championnat National, the third tier of French football, for the first time in its history.

Squad

References

External links
  

Association football clubs established in 1968
Football clubs in Paris
1968 establishments in France
13th arrondissement of Paris